The 2013–14 Coppa Italia, also known as TIM Cup for sponsorship reasons, was the 67th edition of the competition. As in the previous year, 78 clubs have taken part in the tournament. Lazio were the cup holders. Napoli were the winners, thus qualifying for the group stage of the 2014–15 UEFA Europa League.

First round
First round matches were played on 3, 4 and 6 August 2013.

Second round
Second round matches were played on 10 & 11 August 2013.

Third round
Third round matches were played on 17 & 18 August 2013.

Fourth round
Fourth Round matches were played on 3, 4 and 5 December 2013.

Final stage

Bracket

Round of 16

Quarter-finals

Semi-finals

First leg

Second leg

Final

Top goalscorers

References

Coppa Italia seasons
Italy
Coppa Italia